Eric Ho is an American architect.

Ho is most noted for his "MiLES" (Made in the Lower East Side) project, which raised over $32,000 in crowdsourcing funds. whose kickstarter raised over $32,000. The project was created to convert over 200 abandoned New York City storefronts into usable spaces. According to The New York Times, Ho hoped that theater companies could take advantage of the spaces.

References

External links
 official website for miLES

American architects
Living people
Year of birth missing (living people)